Gustavo Santos may refer to:

 Gustavo dos Santos (born 1991), Brazilian sprinter
 Gustavo Santos (footballer) (born 2002), Brazilian football forward
 Gustavo Santos (politician), Argentine politician